The Student Radio Association (SRA) is a representative body which supports and acts on behalf of the UK student radio community, comprising radio stations that are associated with or linked to a place of education. It is a not-for-profit organisation, which exists to encourage and facilitate communication between student stations. It was dissolved by Companies House in May 2018, but was reincorporated on 30 August 2019 as the Student Radio Association Ltd Ltd.

History

The SRA was formed following the liquidation of the National Association of Student Broadcasting (NASB), which was formed as a limited company on 5 August 1988. NASB, a Private company limited by guarantee, was dissolved in January 2002, although had collapsed as a business in 1991. That year saw the creation of the SRA as a community. In November 2007, the SRA was incorporated as a Private Company Limited by Guarantee. There are 65 member stations of the SRA, which includes student radio stations across the UK. Membership to the SRA is on a yearly basis.

The SRA receives support from a number of industry partners, some which have been associated with the organisation for many years. The Radio Academy provides free membership for SRA members. Students involved with the SRA automatically become part of the Association of Student Radio Alumni (ASRA) following their graduation, which is a network of people formerly involved in student radio. Other associated organisations include Skillset, which offers employment opportunities in the radio industry, and RadioCentre, which provides speakers at SRA events.

The SRA Officers

The SRA is run by officers that have various roles within the organisation. The SRA is governed by an elected executive team, with elections held annually and voted by the station managers of member stations. The latest elections took place at the 2021 SRA Conference, with the following individuals elected to office from July 2021:
Chair – Danny Humby
Operations Officer – Holly Markham
Network Officer – Hebe Lawson
Marketing and Communications Officer – Hannah Willoughby
Membership Officer – Tom Jackson
Events Officer - Matt Ward-Perkins

Administrative roles within the SRA are chosen by the departing executive team. The SRA also appoints regional officers that provide support for stations in a region of the UK. Candidates for regional officers are elected to the role following a vote by the station managers in their region.

The Student Radio Awards (SRAs)

The Student Radio Awards (SRAs) is an awards scheme celebrating talent within the UK student radio industry, held annually since 1995 and supported by BBC Radio 1, the ASRA and Global Radio. The awards are announced in a ceremony in November, with past presenters including well-known radio personalities, such as Fearne Cotton, Scott Mills, and Nick Grimshaw. The first awards took place at the University of London Union. Due to the increased popularity of the event, the SRAs moved to The indigO2 in London in 2008. The awards on offer range from Best Newcomer, Best Interview, and Best Live Event, up to the most prestigious, Best Student Station of the Year. The current Awards Chairperson is Stephanie Hirst. Previous chairs have included Huw Stephens, Steve Lamacq, and Jo Whiley.

In 2008, the Kevin Greening Creativity Award was introduced to reward students that had displayed new and innovative radio. The award is named in honour of Kevin Greening, a former chair of the awards and presenter on Cambridge University Radio. Greening co-hosted The Radio 1 Breakfast Show with Zoë Ball from 1997 to 1998, prior to his death in 2007.

As well as student radio award trophy, winners of the best male and female awards are also given the chance to host a show on BBC Radio 1. In 2012, female winner Hattie Pearson, from Fuse FM, covered an early morning breakfast slot on the station on 29 March 2013. Best male winner Ethan O'Leary, from Spark FM, covered the same show on 1 April 2013. Also in 2012, Abbie McCarthy, from RaW 1251AM, was offered free training from the BBC Academy after winning the Best Newcomer trophy. Many past winners of Student Radio Awards have gone on to become big names within the UK radio industry, most notably Greg James (Winner Best Male 2005), who now works at Radio 1, and Mark Crossley (Winner Best Male 2008), who now works at Absolute Radio.

SRA Conference

Each year, the SRA holds a conference, usually during the University Easter break. Each year, member stations submit a conference proposal to hold the conference at their university. The SRA committee selects the winning station towards the start of each year. The conference takes place over 3 days and is funded through ticket sales. At the SRA Conference, speakers are invited to speak on a variety of subjects, including the future of Student Radio and radio techniques. Speakers are invited from radio organisations, such as the controller of BBC Radio 1 Ben Cooper.

From 2010, the 'Amplify Awards' (formerly 'I Love Student Radio' awards) have been held at the conference. These are in addition to the SRAs and are dedicated to rewarding the people behind the scenes of student radio. Awards include the best region, which was won in 2013 by the North West region. As well as the awards, the SRA annual general meeting is held at the conference, including the election of the New SRA Executive team.

The locations of the most recent conferences are listed below:
The 2009 Student Radio Conference was held at Leeds University.
The 2010 Student Radio Conference was held at Nottingham Trent University.
The 2011 Student Radio Conference was held at the University of Hertfordshire.
The 2012 Student Radio Conference was held at the University of Bradford.
The 2013 Student Radio Conference was hosted at De Montfort University (Leicester).
The 2014 Student Radio Conference was hosted at Newcastle University
The 2015 Student Radio Conference was hosted at the University of Exeter.
The 2016 Student Radio Conference was hosted at the University of Cardiff.
The 2017 Student Radio Conference was hosted at De Montfort University (Leicester).
The 2018 Student Radio Conference was hosted at the University of East Anglia.
The 2019 Student Radio Conference was hosted at University of Swansea.
The 2021 Student Radio Conference was hosted Virtually.
The 2022 Student Radio Conference was hosted at Newcastle University.
The 2023 Student Radio Conference will be hosted at University of Exeter.

SRA Chart Show

The SRA runs the National Student Radio Chart Show, which broadcasts live across the UK every Sunday from 2pm. The chart broadcasts from a different member station each week, with student presenters from that station in charge of the show. The show is aired on member stations that have signed up to air the show and is repeated on across the student radio network throughout the week.

The show lasts for 120 minutes, counting down the top 20 biggest hits playing on student radio across the UK. Stations that host the show are eligible to enter the Best Student Radio Chart Show category at the Student Radio Awards.

References

External links
 SRA website
 Association of Student Radio Alumni (ASRA)

Radio organisations in the United Kingdom
UK Student Radio Association
Student organisations in the United Kingdom